Papyrus 90 (in the Gregory-Aland numbering), designated by 𝔓90, is a small fragment from the Gospel of John 18:36-19:7 dating palaeographically to the late 2nd century.

The Greek text of this codex is a representative of the Alexandrian text-type. Aland placed it in Category I (because of its date).

Philip W. Comfort says "𝔓90 has [close] textual affinity with 𝔓66 ... [and] some affinity with א (Aleph)."

It is currently housed at the Sackler Library (Papyrology Rooms, P. Oxy. 3523) in Oxford.

Greek text
The papyrus is written on both sides. The characters that are in bold style are the ones that can be seen in 𝔓90.

Gospel of John 18:36-19:1 (recto)

Gospel of John 19:1-7 (verso)

See also
 List of New Testament papyri
 Oxyrhynchus Papyri

References

Further reading

 T. C. Skeat, Oxyrhynchus Papyri L (London: 1983), pp. 3–8. 
 Robinson, James M,Fragments from the Cartonnage of P75, Harvard Theological Review, 101:2, Apr 2008, p. 247. 
 Philip W. Comfort, Early Manuscripts & Modern Translations of the New Testament, pp. 68–69

Images
 Leaf from 𝔓90

External links
 P90/P.Oxy.L 3523
 POxy – Oxyrhynchus Papyri online database
 Robert B. Waltz. NT Manuscripts: Papyri, Papyri 𝔓90.

New Testament papyri
2nd-century biblical manuscripts
Early Greek manuscripts of the New Testament
Gospel of John papyri
Barabbas